Black Out is a 1970 Swiss film directed by Jean-Louis Roy. It was entered into the 20th Berlin International Film Festival.

Cast
 Marcel Merminod as Émile Blummer
 Lucie Avenay as Élise Blummer
 Marcel Imhoff as Le pasteur
 Georges Wod as Le capitaine Schnertz
 Robert Bachofner as Le petit garçon
 Michel Breton as Le vendeur

References

External links

1970 films
Swiss drama films
1970s French-language films
French-language Swiss films